Mycobacterium conspicuum is a species of the phylum Actinomycetota (Gram-positive bacteria with high guanine and cytosine content, one of the dominant phyla of all bacteria), belonging to the genus Mycobacterium.

Description
Gram-positive and nonmotile acid-fast coccobacilli. Does not form spores, capsules or aerial hyphae.

Colony characteristics 
Dysgonic and nonphotochromogenic, pale yellow colonies on Löwenstein-Jensen agar.

Physiology
Slow growth on Löwenstein-Jensen medium at temperatures between 22 °C and 31 °C after 2–3 weeks.
Susceptible to ethambutol, rifampin, streptomycin, resistant to pyrazinamide.
Synthesis of α- and keto-mycolates and wax esters.
no tolerance to 5% NaCl, positive for Tween 80 hydrolysis and for 10-day-arylsulfatase. Negative for production of nicotinic acid, acetamidase, benzamidase, urease, isonicotinamidase, nicotinamidase, pyrazinamidase, succinidamidase, nitrate reductase and tellurite reduction.

Pathogenesis
Opportunistic pathogen, disseminated mycobacteriosis,  Biosafety level 2.

Type Strain
First isolated from two male HIV infected patients in Germany.
Strain 3895/92 = ATCC 700090 = CIP 105165 = DSM 44136.

References

Springer et al. 1996. Mycobacterium conspicuum sp. nov., a new species isolated from patients with disseminated infections. J. Clin. Microbiol., 33, 2805–2811.

External links
Type strain of Mycobacterium conspicuum at BacDive -  the Bacterial Diversity Metadatabase

Acid-fast bacilli
conspicuum
Bacteria described in 1996